Tied & Tickled Trio is a German electronica/dub/jazz musical collective. It was founded in 1994 by Markus Acher and Christoph Brandner in Weilheim, Bavaria as a polyrythmic duo playing drums only. After the joining of sculptor Andreas Gerth (electronics) and Markus' brother Micha (bass), the core of "Tied & Tickled Trio" was formed and their style turned to jazz. This trend later was fixed with new member coming – Johannes Enders, a studied jazz sax player.

The collective shares members with The Notwist, Lali Puna and other bands from the Morr Music label.

Band members 

 Ulrich Wangenheim (tenor saxophone, bass clarinet, flute)
 Johannes Enders (tenor saxophone, flute, keyboards)
 Micha Acher (bass, trumpet, trombone, keyboards, organ)
 Markus Acher (drums, keyboards, percussion)
 Andreas Gerth (electronic, delays)
 Christoph Brandner (electronic drums)
 Robert Klinger (bass)

Discography

Albums 
 Tied + Tickled Trio – (Payola/Kollaps, 1997) (Morr Music re-release, 2006)
 EA1 EA2 – (Payola/Virgin, 1999)
 EA1 EA2 Rmx – (Morr Music, 2000)
 Electric Avenue Tapes – (Clearspot, 2001)
 Observing Systems – (Morr Music, 2003)
 Aelita – (Morr Music, 2007)
 La Place Demon (with American drummer Billy Hart) – Morr Music, 2011

Other 
 A.R.C. (Live DVD + Audio 19 minutes jam, 2006)

External links 
 Tied & Tickled Trio – official website.
 

German musical groups
Morr Music artists